The Khilok is a river in Eastern Siberia, a right tributary of the Selenga. There are a few settlements on its banks: Khilok, Bada etc.

Arakhley Lake belongs to the Khilok river basin.

See also
List of rivers of Russia

See also
Selenga Highlands
List of rivers of Russia

References

Rivers of Zabaykalsky Krai
Rivers of Buryatia